Sgurr an Doire Lethain (1,010 m) is a mountain in the Northwest Highlands of Scotland. It is located south of Glen Shiel in the Kintail area.

One of seven Munros on the long Glen Sheil ridge, it is usually climbed in the conjunction with the other six. The nearest village is Shiel Bridge.

References

Mountains and hills of the Northwest Highlands
Marilyns of Scotland
Munros
One-thousanders of Scotland